Cloetta or Cloëtta may refer to:
 Cloetta, Swedish company
 Cloëtta Prize, Swiss biomedical distinction
 Cloetta Center, former name of the Saab Arena